Alişan (pronounced Alishan) is an uncommon Turkish male first name. It may refer to:

 Alişan (born 1976), Turkish singer
 Alişan Şeker (born 1986), Turkish footballer

See also
Alisan
Alisan Porter (born 1981), American actress
Ghevont Alishan (1820-1901), ordained Armenian Catholic priest, historian and a poet

Turkish masculine given names